Colette Renard (1 November 1924, Ermont – 6 October 2010, Saint-Rémy-lès-Chevreuse), born Colette Lucie Raget, was a French actress and singer. Renard is closely associated with the titular character from the musical Irma La Douce, a role she played for over a decade.

Renard retired from theatre and film in the 1980s, returning in 2004 to play the role of Rachel Levy on Plus belle la vie. In addition to acting, Renard was a prolific singer, having released 52 albums during her career.

Discography

Studio albums 
 1957: Chante Paris (double 25 cm)
 1958: Chante la vieille France (25 cm)
 1958: Envoie la musique (25 cm)
 1960: Chansons gaillardes de la vieille France
 1961: Tête-à-tête avec Colette Renard
 1961: La chanson française
 1963: Chansons très libertines
 1965: Bon appétit...
 1966: Poèmes libertins du temps passé (triple 33 T)
 1966: Poèmes libertins du temps présent
 1967: 1967 - La nouvelle Colette Renard
 1968: Irma la douce (double album of duets)
 1968: La chanson satirique de Charlemagne à Charles de Gaulle - 1ère époque (double album)
 1969: Chansons polissonnes
 1969: Paris-Montmartre
 1971: Liverpool la nuit
 1972: Chansons galantes
 1973: Au clocher de mon coeur (double album)
 1973: Chansons érotiques du royaume de France
 1975: Depuis le temps que je chante que je t'aime
 1978: Une valse bleue
 1979: Il y a des jours comme ça
 1983: B.O.F. Un amour de femme
 1986: Fables d'aujourd'hui (spoken word, written by Lucien Baumann)
 2002: Ceux qui s'aiment

Live albums 
 1958: À l'Olympia - 10 chansons nouvelles (25 cm)
 1960: À l'Olympia - Volume 8
 1962: À l'Olympia
 1964: Récital 65
 1976: À Bobino

Compilations 
 1987: Les grands succès (cd Vogue, 16 songs)
 1992: 36 chansons gaillardes et libertines (double cd Vogue)
 2001: Colette Renard (Triple cd, Reader's Digest selection, 72 songs)

45 RPM 
 78 T Pacific 1998: La gorgonzola / Robinson Crusoë (1949)
 EP Festival FX 451148M : Les filles du bucheron / A la belle étoile / Qu'elle est belle / Sous les pommiers (sortis sur deux 78 T en 1952, regroupés sur cet EP en 1958)
 EP Vogue EPL 7273: Les godasses / Ferme-là / Simonetta / L'âge atomique (Rock Around The Island) (1956)
 EP Vogue EPL 7293: L'arbre et l'homme / Les jouets / L'homme et l'araignée / Mon île (1956)
 EP Vogue EPL 7300: Chante les airs d'Irma la douce : Avec les anges / Irma la douce / Y'a qu'Paris pour ça / Ah ! dis donc (1956)
 EP Vogue EPL 7365: Quand t'auras mangé ta soupe / L'homme en habit / Calypso mélodie / Où va-t-on se nicher ? (1957)
 EP Vogue EPL 7367: Zon, zon, zon / Sa casquette / Sur le pont St Louis / C'est du soleil de t'embrasser (1957)
 EP Vogue EPL 7394: Chante les succès du film Un roi à New York : Mandoline amoureuse / Toi l'amour / La complainte des cœur purs / Sur les bords de Paris (1957)
 EP Vogue EPL 7438: Croquemitoufle / Tais-toi Marseille / L'orphéon / A Paris, y'a tout ça (1958)
 EP Vogue EPL 7440: Zon, zon, zon / Sa casquette / L'homme en habit / Où va-t'on se nicher ? (1958)
 EP Vogue EPL 7440: Les chansons gaillardes de la vieille France : Les filles de La Rochelle / La femme du roulier / Sur la route de Louviers / Les trente brigands (1958)
 EP Vogue EPL 7510: L'eau vive / Le bonheur / Envoie-la musique / Trois fois rien (1958)
 EP Vogue EPL 7544: Ca, c'est d'la musique / L'enfant aux oranges / La Sainte-Flemme / C'est moi la java (1958)
 EP Vogue EPL 7565: Le poète / Le soleil / Marie la bleue / La fleur des champs (1958)
 EP Vogue EPL 7568: Noëls : Je n'ai pas eu de jouets / Serge et Nathalie / Drôle d'histoire / La Vierge à la crèche (1958)
 EP Vogue EPL 7576: Le cheval de bois / La débine / Les chagrins d'amour / Faux-pas (1959)
 EP Vogue EPL 7625: L'Opéra de quat'sous : Le chant des canons / La fiancée du pirate / La complainte de Mackie / La chanson de Barbara (1959)
 EP Vogue EPL 7637: Mon homme est un guignol / Y veut de la java / Emmène-moi / Les regrets de jeunesse (1959)
 EP Vogue EPL 7638: Chansons de films : Comment voulez-vous ? / Business / La complainte de Gaud / Bal de nuit (1959)
 EP Vogue EPL 7652: Les chefs-d'oeuvre de la chanson française : Colette Renard chante la vieille France : À la claire fontaine / Le retour du marin / Va mon ami va / Aux marches du palais (1959)
 EP Vogue EPL 7658: Chansons gaillardes de la vieille France : La puce / Le doigt gelé / En revenant du Piémont / Au clair de la lune (1959)
 EP Vogue EPL 7664: C'est d'la musique / Tais-toi Marseille / L'orphéon / Marie la bleue (1959)
 EP Vogue EPL 7700: Mes copains / T'as misé dans le mille / Qu'est-ce que t'as pu me faire / Le pauvre chien (1959)
 EP Vogue EPL 7726: Petite annonce sentimentale / Les musiciens / Toi, l'inconnu / Le vendeur de roses (1960)
 EP Vogue EPL 7730: Mon homme est un guignol / Je n'ai pas eu de jouets / Emmène-moi / Le bonheur (1960)
 EP Vogue EPL 7775: La taxi girl / Ma rengaine / Je m'appelle Daysie / Des histoires (1960)
 EP Vogue EPL 7806: 4,95 la charlotte / On cultive l'amour / T'es le roi / Rue du croissant (1961)
 EP Vogue EPL 7823: La fille et le soldat / Comme un cygne blanc / La chanson pauvre / Paris a le cœur tendre (1961)
 EP Vogue EPL 7865: Les p'tits français / Ma chanson lonla-lonlaine / Suis-moi t'en auras / Hôtel du nord (1961)
 EP Vogue EPL 7874: La Marie du port / Les enfants de Paris / Quand sonneront les cloches / Ca m'chavire (1961)
 EP Vogue EPL 7929: Charmante nature / Des souv'nirs, des souv'nirs / Ah ! Donnez m'en de la chanson / Bilissi (1962)
 EP Vogue EPL 8061: Voir Naples et mourir / Professionnellement / Le grand partage / La samba des parisiennes (1962)
 EP Vogue EPL 7931: Le marin et la rose / Sacré bistrot / Ils jouent de la trompette / C'est la vie (1962)
 EP Vogue EPL 8074: Hardi Paname (version 45t) / Sur leur visage / J't'aimerai pas plus / Heureusement (1963)
 45t Vogue  V.45.1076 : Le retour des héros / Alors, c'est pour quand ? (1963)
 EP Vogue EPL 8141: La foraine / Ils voulaient voir la mer / Les nuits d'une demoiselle [version soft expurgée] (1963)
 EP Vogue EPL 8183: Mon père et ma mère / La dernière petit note / Le truc / Chez Marie la vieille (1963)
 EP Vogue EPL 8295: Le plumard / Assieds-toi donc sur ta valise / Le rencard / Elle ou moi (1964)
 EP Vogue EPL 8332: Ah! Le petit vin blanc / Le chaland qui passe / Refrain des chevaux de bois / Ici l'on pèche (1965)
 EP Vogue EPL 8375: Alfred Hitchcock / Mossieu Boby / Gibraltar story / La goélette et le capitaine (1965)
 EP CBS 5676: Chante Jehanne Vérité : Un petit oiseau de Lorraine / Les chalands / Toutes les larmes / Les moutons (1966)
 EP Decca 461.113M: Un piano / L'amour et les marées / Marie scandale (1967)
 EP Decca 461.131M: Les maisons blanches / Je l'aime lui / Reste / Un garçon (1967)
 45t Decca 79.528: Un air pour rien / Y a du soleil dans ma chambre (1968)
 45t Decca 23.812: Je l'ai vécu 100 fois / Marine (1968)
 45t Decca 23.813: L'araignée / Ne riez pas de la bergère (1968)
 45t Decca 23.814: La romance de Paris / La rue de notre amour (1968)
 45t Emi/Pathé C006-11437: Lili Vertu / Changer de vie (1971)
 45t Vogue V.45.4138: Chante Cabaret : Willkommen, Bienvenue... / Cabaret (1972)
 EP Vogue 45.V.4211: Les chansons de la comédie "Folle Amanda" : Mon Polo / Mon coeur attend qui ? / Que c'est bon d'être amoureuse / C'est beau la vie (1973)
 45t Vogue 14098: B.O.F de Jean-François Davy Prostitution (1975), 1 title: Demain (1976)
 45t Sonopresse 40289: Mirlitons / Je suis marionnette (1978)
 45t Carrère 13.137: Chante Vichy Dancing : Amoureuse / Nostalgies (1983)

Selected songs 
 1956: Ah ! Dis donc, dis donc (Lyrics: Alexandre Breffort, Music: Marguerite Monnot)
 1957: Zon… zon… zon… (Lyrics: Maurice Vidalin, Music: Jacques Datin)
 1958: Tais-toi Marseille (Lyrics: Maurice Vidalin, Music: Jacques Datin)
 1958: Ça, c'est d'la musique (Lyrics: Michel Rivgauche, Music: Norbert Glanzberg)
 1958: Sa casquette (Lyrics: Fernand Bonifay, Music: Guy Magenta)
 1959: Mon homme est un guignol (Lyrics and music: Jil and Jan)
 1960: Des histoires (Lyrics: Michel Vaucaire, Music: Charles Dumont)
 1961: Chanson tendre (Lyrics: Francis Carco, Music: Jacques Larmanjat)
 1962: Le marin et la rose (Lyrics and music: Huard Pingault)
 1979: Les lignes de ma vie
 2002: Ceux qui s'aiment (Lyrics: Colette Renard, Music: François Rauber)

Bibliography 
 Colette Renard, Raconte-moi ta chanson, Grasset, 1998, 334 p. 
 Colette Renard, Ceux qui s'aiment : bloc-notes 1956-2006, edited by Pascal Maurice, Paris et Montréal, 2006, 64 p.

Filmography

Film
 1958: , Josianne Mauvin
 1960: Business, Léa
 1963: A King Without Distraction (Un roi sans divertissement), Clara
 1965: Les pieds dans le plâtre, Irène
 1970: Clodo, Mme Olga
 1992: , Clarisse/Monique

Television
 1964 : Pierrots des Alouettes, musical comedy by Henri Spade, Martine
 1972: Les dossiers de Me Robineau: Les cagnards (TV movie), Gina
 1973: La vie rêvée de Vincent Scotto (TV movie), Fréhel
 1980: La chanson de Tiber (TV movie), Tiber Renarde
 1982: Mon petit âne, ma mère (TV movie) The mother
 1983: Vichy Dancing (TV movie), Véra Belmont
 1986: Noël au Congo (TV movie), Mme Martel
 1999: Justice (TV series), Olga
 2003: Maigret (TV series), Jacqueline Larrieux dite Jacotte
 2004: Docteur Dassin, généraliste (TV series),  Mme Barry
 2004 - 2009: Plus belle la vie (TV series), Rachel Lévy
 2005: Le triporteur de Belleville (TV movie), Mme Belvèze

Theatre
 1956: Irma La Douce by Alexandre Breffort and Marguerite Monnot, mise en scène René Dupuy, Théâtre Gramont
 1982: Un amour de femme, songs by Michel Rivgauche, music by Gérard Calvi, mise en scène Jean Meyer, Théâtre des Célestins

Distinctions and awards
 Grand prix of the Académie Charles Cros
 Grand prix of the Académie du disque français
 Grand prix of the Président de la République
 Grand prix international du disque
 Officer of the Ordre des Arts et des Lettres
 Médaille de vermeil from the City of Paris

References

External links
 
Irma la douce - Colette Renard Institut national de l'audiovisuel

1924 births
2010 deaths
Deaths from cancer in France
Deaths from brain tumor
French film actresses
French stage actresses
French television actresses
Officiers of the Ordre des Arts et des Lettres
People from Ermont
20th-century French actresses
21st-century French actresses
20th-century French women singers